was a Japanese baseball player and manager who was a member of the Japanese Baseball League. He was a manager for six seasons for the Kintetsu Pearls of the Japan Pacific League. In 1988 he was elected to the Japanese Baseball Hall of Fame.

References

Japanese baseball players
Japanese baseball coaches
Managers of baseball teams in Japan
Osaka Kintetsu Buffaloes managers
Waseda University alumni
1903 births
1987 deaths